Baron Montagu of Boughton is a British title which has been created twice for members of the Noble House of Montagu. First created in 1621, in the Peerage of England, for Sir Edward Montagu, eldest son of Sir Edward Montagu of Boughton and grandson of another Sir Edward Montagu who had been Lord Chief Justice during the reign of Henry VIII. He was also the brother of Henry Montagu, later created Earl of Manchester, and of Sidney Montagu, ancestor of the Earls of Sandwich.

Their ancestor was one Richard Ladde, grandfather of the Lord Chief Justice Sir Edward, who changed his name to Montagu in about 1447. His descendants claimed a connection with the main house of Montagu or Montacute, Barons Montagu and Earls of Salisbury, but the exact descent is unclear. A case has been made out for the possibility that the Ladde alias came from a division among coheirs about 1420 of the remaining small inheritance of a line of Montagus at Spratton and Little Creton, also in Northamptonshire.

The third Baron Montagu of Boughton was created Earl of Montagu and Viscount Monthermer in 1689 and Duke of Montagu and Marquess of Monthermer in 1705. He had married in 1675 the Lady Elizabeth Wriothesley, daughter of the 4th Earl of Southampton and a descendant of the original houses of Montagu and Monthermer. The Dukedom, Earldom and Barony of Montagu all became extinct on the death of their son John, 2nd Duke of Montagu, in 1749. The next creation was in 1762, in the Peerage of Great Britain. John Montagu, styled Lord Brudenell, son of the 4th Earl of Cardigan and maternal grandson of the last Duke of Montagu, was created Baron Montagu of Boughton in 1762. This title became extinct on his death without issue in 1770.

The next creation was for the late Baron's father, who had been created Duke of Montagu in 1766. He was created Baron Montagu of Boughton, again in the Peerage of Great Britain, in 1786. On his death in 1790, when the Dukedom became extinct, the Barony passed under a special remainder to his female-line grandson Lord Henry Scott, second son of the 3rd Duke of Buccleuch. Lord Henry Scott also inherited the Lordship of Bowland from his mother, the Duchess, having the title entailed upon him by his nephew, the 5th Duke, in 1827. He died in 1845 whereupon the title of Montagu of Boughton became extinct.

His great-nephew Lord Henry Douglas-Scott-Montagu, second son of the 5th Duke of Buccleuch, was created Baron Montagu of Beaulieu in 1885.

Barons Montagu of Boughton, first creation (1621)

Edward Montagu, 1st Baron Montagu of Boughton (1560–1644)
Edward Montagu, 2nd Baron Montagu of Boughton (1616–1684)
Ralph Montagu, 3rd Baron Montagu of Boughton (1638–1709), created Earl and then Duke of Montagu
John Montagu, 4th Baron Montagu of Boughton, 2nd Duke of Montagu (1690–1749)

Barons Montagu of Boughton, second creation (1762)

John Montagu, 1st Baron Montagu of Boughton (died 1770)

Barons Montagu of Boughton, third creation (1786)

George Montagu, 1st Duke of Montagu, 1st Baron Montagu of Boughton (1712–1790)
Henry James Montagu-Scott, 2nd Baron Montagu of Boughton (1776–1845)

See also
Baron Montagu
Baron Montagu of Beaulieu

References

Baronies in the Peerage of Great Britain
Extinct baronies in the Peerage of Great Britain
Peerages created for eldest sons of peers
1621 establishments in England

Peerages created with special remainders
Noble titles created in 1621
Noble titles created in 1762
Noble titles created in 1786